In the spring of 1914, Olympic Committee of Serbia organized for the first time as a football competition between the most successful Serbian clubs.  It was played in cup format as single round-robin system and was known as "Srpski kup" (Serbian Cup) or "Srpski Olimpijski Kup" (Serbian Olympic Cup). The winner of the first ever Serbian football tournament was SK Velika Srbija The final was played on May 11th 1914, in Košutnjak, Belgrade, home ground of SK Soko.  It was the pioneer football competition organised in the Kingdom of Serbia.

Final

References

Olympic
Olympic Cup
Serbia
Defunct football competitions in Serbia